Gilbert Maxwell (February 13, 1910-November 1979) was a poet, New York actor, and author.

Books
Gilbert, who was a friend of Tennessee Williams, wrote several books, including Tennessee Williams and Friends: an Informal Biography (1965) and Helen Morgan: Her Life and Legend New York: Hawthorn Books. .. (1974).

Poetry
Maxwell published poetry in Poetry magazine between 1933 and 1937. These included his poems Mortality, Boy and Hawk, Farewell, From a Piazza in the South, Symbol for Static Grief, and Forfeits.

Transcripts of his poems are located in the archives of the University of Florida.

Final years
Gilbert spent his final years in Florida and died in North Miami Beach, Florida, in November 1979.

Bibliography
 Look to the Lightning.  New York: Dodd, Mead & Co., 1933. (Poetry)
 Stranger's Garment.  New York: Dodd, Mead & Co., 1936.  (Poetry)
 The Dark Rain Falling.  Prairie City, IL: Press of James A. Decker, 1942.  (Poetry)
 The Sleeping Trees.  Boston: Little, Brown & Co., 1949.  (Fiction)
 Go Looking: Poems, 1933-1953.  Boston: Bruce Humphries, 1954.  (Poetry)
 Tennessee Williams and Friends.  New York: The World Publishing Company, 1965.  (Biography).
 Helen Morgan: Her Life and Legend.  New York: Hawthorn Books, 1974.  (Biography)

References

1910 births
1979 deaths
Male actors from New York City
Male actors from Miami
20th-century American male actors
20th-century American poets
People from North Miami Beach, Florida